Elaeocarpus carolinae is a species of flowering plant in the family Elaeocarpaceae and is endemic to north-east Queensland. It is a tree with buttress roots at the base of the trunk, elliptic to oblong leaves with wavy-toothed edges, flowers with five white petals with lobed tips and spherical blue to purple fruit.

Description

Taxonomy
Elaeocarpus carolinae was first formally described in 1984 by Bernard Hyland and Mark James Elgar Coode in the Kew Bulletin from material collected in 1979.

Distribution and habitat

Conservation status
This quandong is listed as of 'least concern' under the Queensland Government Nature Conservation Act 1992.

See also
 List of Elaeocarpus species

References

Oxalidales of Australia
carolinae
Flora of Queensland
Plants described in 1984
Endemic flora of Australia